Volnay is a commune in the Côte-d'Or department in eastern France.

In the middle of the Côte de Beaune, it is a well-known appellation of Burgundy wine.

Population

Wine

In general, the wines are lighter than most other red Burgundies from the Côte-d'Or. 80,000 cases of red wine come from its 242ha of vineyards, of which 115ha is split among 26 Premier Crus. The most notable of these are Bousse d'Or, Champans, Clos des Chenes, Clos des Ducs, Les Caillerets, Santenots and Taille Pied.

Red wine from the Santenots vineyard is classified as Volnay Santenots, whereas white wine from the same vineyard can call itself Meursault Premier Cru or Meursault Santenots.

See also
 Communes of the Côte-d'Or department
 Burgundy wine
 Route des Grands Crus
 Côte de Beaune
 Ensemble Santenay - an ensemble specializing in the performance of Early Music.

References

Further reading
 Coates, Clive (1997) Côte D'Or: A Celebration of the Great Wines of Burgundy Weidenfeld Nicolson

External links

 thewinedoctor.com A great overview of the geography and wines of Burgundy
 Details of the vineyards within the Côte de Beaune.
 The Burgundy Report Good descriptions of the vineyards and vintages.

Communes of Côte-d'Or